Akhmedkent (Kaitag: Ахӏмадла шши; Dargwa: ГIяхIмалаша) is a rural locality (a selo) and the administrative centre of Akhmedkentsky Selsoviet, Kaytagsky District, Republic of Dagestan, Russia. The population was 1,023 as of 2010. There are 28 streets.

Geography 
Akhmedkent is located 2 km west of Madzhalis (the district's administrative centre) by road. Madzhalis and Sanchi are the nearest rural localities.

History 
Whilst travelling in the Caucasus, German explorer Samuel Gottlieb Gmelin was taken hostage by Usmey Khan of Khaïtakes and died of ill treatment in captivity in Akhmedkent.

Nationalities 
Dargins live there.

Famous residents 
 Gadzhimagomed Kambulatov (Hero of Socialist Labor)
 Galiz Chupanov (Hero of Socialist Labor)
 Samuel Gottlieb Gmelin (1745–1774), German physician and botanist

References 

Rural localities in Kaytagsky District